Thomas Brett may refer to:
 Thomas Brett (cricketer) (1747–1809), English cricketer
 Thomas Brett (nonjuror) (1667–1743), English nonjuring clergyman
 Thomas Rutherford Brett (1931–2021), United States federal judge
 Thomas Brett (MP for Hastings) (died 1568), MP for Hastings (UK Parliament constituency)
 Thomas Brett (MP for New Romney) (died 1638) for New Romney (UK Parliament constituency)
 Tom Brett (born 1989), English cricketer
 Tom Brett, character in B.F.'s Daughter